Bobbitt is a surname. Notable people with the surname include:

Arch Bobbitt, Associate Justice of the Indiana Supreme Court
Betty Bobbitt, American-Australian actress
John Franklin Bobbitt, American educator
James M. Bobbitt (1930–2021), American chemist and professor
John and Lorena Bobbitt, couple whose disputes led to a severed (and re-attached) penis
Robert Lee Bobbitt, Texas politician
Philip Bobbitt, American author on Constitutional and military strategy
Sean Bobbitt, Texas-born British cinematographer 
William H. Bobbitt, Chief Justice of the North Carolina Supreme Court

See also
Justice Bobbitt (disambiguation)
The Bobbitt worm, also known as Eunice aphroditois an aquatic predatory polychaete